WOOT-LD, virtual channel 6 (UHF digital channel 19), is a low-powered Heartland-affiliated television station licensed to Chattanooga, Tennessee, United States. The station is the flagship of the Get After It Media Group and its digital subchannel networks: Retro TV and Rev'n.

History
WOOT was affiliated with UPN until it went silent in 2000 due to technical issues. Afterwards, the UPN affiliation was picked up part-time by WYHB-CA (now a full-time America One affiliate), then by CBS affiliate WDEF-TV in 2004 as a secondary affiliation.

While WOOT-LP was still silent, its license was upgraded to Class A status. The station apparently returned to the air in late-2007.

Chattanooga-based Luken Communications acquired WOOT-LP from its previous owner, Tiger Eye Broadcasting Corporation, in 2010.

Luken took the analog channel 6 signal off the air on November 2, 2011 so that it could flash-cut it to digital on channel 31. The digital channel took the call sign WOOT-LD on December 19, 2011, and signed on in early 2012 via Special Temporary Authority (STA) as Chattanooga's new Retro Television Network (RTV) owned-and-operated station (prior to the beginning of 2012, WRCB-DT2 served as Chattanooga's RTV affiliate until it dropped RTV in favor of a competing retro network, Antenna TV). It added five subchannels–all carrying networks that are at least partially owned by Luken.

WOOT's license was initially canceled on December 5, 2012 after its analog signal was dark for over a year. However, Luken filed a petition for reconsideration, stating that its digital signal has been in operation since January 2012. As a result, the WOOT license was reinstated. In addition, Luken requested, and was granted, a request to surrender the station's Class A status; therefore, it has reverted to low-power status. It also had a construction permit to move its digital signal, which formerly operated on RF channel 31 under Special Temporary Authority, to RF channel 38.

Digital channels
The station's digital signal is multiplexed:

References

Heartland (TV network) affiliates
Retro TV affiliates
Rev'n affiliates
OOT-LD
1985 establishments in Tennessee
Television channels and stations established in 1985